A saber-tooth (alternatively spelled sabre-tooth) is any member of various extinct groups of predatory therapsids, predominantly carnivoran mammals, that are characterized by long, curved saber-shaped canine teeth which protruded from the mouth when closed. Saber-toothed mammals have been found almost worldwide from the Eocene epoch to the end of the Pleistocene epoch 42 million years ago (mya) – 11,000 years ago (kya).
 
One of the best-known genera is the machairodont or "saber-toothed cat" Smilodon, the species of which, especially S. fatalis, are popularly referred to as "saber-toothed tigers", although they are not closely related to tigers (Panthera). Despite some similarities, not all saber-tooths are closely related to saber-toothed cats or felids in-general. Instead, many members are classified into different families of Feliformia, such as Barbourofelidae and Nimravidae; the oxyaenid "creodont" genera Machaeroides and Apataelurus; and two extinct lineages of metatherian mammals, the thylacosmilids of Sparassodonta, and deltatheroideans, which are more closely related to marsupials. In this regard, these saber-toothed mammals can be viewed as examples of convergent evolution. This convergence is remarkable due not only to the development of elongated canines, but also a suite of other characteristics, such as a wide gape and bulky forelimbs, which is so consistent that it has been termed the "saber-tooth suite."

Of the feliform lineages, the family Nimravidae is the oldest, entering the landscape around 42 mya and becoming extinct by 7.2 mya. Barbourofelidae entered around 16.9 mya and were extinct by 9 mya. These two would have shared some habitats.

Morphology

The different groups of saber-toothed predators evolved their saber-toothed characteristics entirely independently. They are most known for having maxillary canines which extended down from the mouth when the mouth was closed. Saber-toothed cats were generally more robust than today's cats and were quite bear-like in build. They are believed to have been excellent hunters, taking animals such as sloths, mammoths, and other large prey. Evidence from the numbers found at the La Brea Tar Pits suggests that Smilodon, like modern lions, was a social carnivore.

The first saber-tooths to appear were non-mammalian synapsids, such as the gorgonopsids; they were one of the first groups of animals within Synapsida to experience the specialization of saber teeth, and many had long canines. Some had two pairs of upper canines with two jutting down from each side, but most had one pair of upper extreme canines. Because of their primitiveness, they are extremely easy to tell from machairodonts. Several defining characteristics are a lack of a coronoid process, many sharp "premolars" more akin to pegs than scissors, and very long skulls. Despite their large canines, however, most gorgonopsians probably lacked the other specializations found in true saber-toothed predator ecomorphs. Two gorgonopsians, Smilesaurus and Inostrancevia, had exceptionally large canines and may have been closer functional analogues to later sabertooths.

The second appearance is in Deltatheroida, a lineage of Cretaceous metatherians. At least one genus, Lotheridium, possessed long canines, and given both the predatory habits of the clade as well as the generally incomplete material, this may have been a more widespread adaptation.
 
The third appearance of long canines is Thylacosmilus, which is the most distinctive of the saber-tooth mammals and is also easy to tell apart. It differs from machairodonts in possessing a very prominent flange and a tooth that is triangular in cross section. The root of the canines is more prominent than in machairodonts and a true sagittal crest is absent.

The fourth instance of saber-teeth is from the clade Oxyaenidae. The small and slender Machaeroides bore canines that were thinner than in the average machairodont. Its muzzle was longer and narrower.

The fifth saber-tooth appearance is the ancient feliform (carnivoran) family Nimravidae. Both groups have short skulls with tall sagittal crests, and their general skull shape is very similar. Some have distinctive flanges, and some have none at all, so this confuses the matter further. Machairodonts were almost always bigger, though, and their canines were longer and more stout for the most part, but exceptions do appear.

The sixth appearance is the barbourofelids. These feliform carnivorans are very closely related to actual cats. The best-known barbourofelid is the eponymous Barbourofelis, which differs from most machairodonts by having a much heavier and more stout mandible, smaller orbits, massive and almost knobby flanges, and canines that are farther back. The average machairodont had well-developed incisors, but barbourofelids' were more extreme.

The seventh and last saber-toothed group to evolve were the machairodonts themselves.

Diet

The evolution of enlarged canines in Tertiary carnivores was a result of large mammals being the source of prey for saber-toothed predators. The development of the saber-toothed condition appears to represent a shift in function and killing behavior, rather than one in predator-prey relations. Many hypotheses exist concerning saber-tooth killing methods, some of which include attacking soft tissue such as the belly and throat, where biting deep was essential to generate killing blows. The elongated teeth also aided with strikes reaching major blood vessels in these large mammals. However, the precise functional advantage of the saber-tooth's bite, particularly in relation to prey size, is a mystery. A new point-to-point bite model is introduced in the article by Andersson et al., showing that for saber-tooth cats, the depth of the killing bite decreases dramatically with increasing prey size. The extended gape of saber-toothed cats results in a considerable increase in bite depth when biting into prey with a radius of less than 10 cm. For the saber-tooth, this size-reversed functional advantage suggests predation on species within a similar size range to those attacked by present-day carnivorans, rather than "megaherbivores" as previously believed.

A disputing view of the cat's hunting technique and ability is presented by C. K. Brain in "The Hunters or the Hunted?" in which he attributes the cat's prey-killing abilities to its large neck muscles rather than its jaws. Large cats use both the upper and lower jaw to bite down and bring down the prey. The strong bite of the jaw is accredited to the strong temporalis muscle that attach from the skull to the coronoid process of the jaw. The larger the coronoid process, the larger the muscle that attaches there, so the stronger the bite. As C.K. Brain points out, the saber-toothed cats had a greatly reduced coronoid process and therefore a disadvantageously weak bite. The cat did, however, have an enlarged mastoid process, a muscle attachment at the base of the skull, which attaches to neck muscles. According to C.K. Brain, the saber-tooth would use a "downward thrust of the head, powered by the neck muscles" to drive the large upper canines into the prey. This technique was "more efficient than those of true cats".

Biology
The similarity in all these unrelated families involves the convergent evolution of the saber-like canines as a hunting adaptation. Meehan et al. note that it took around 8 million years for a new type of saber-toothed cat to fill the niche of an extinct predecessor in a similar ecological role; this has happened at least four times with different families of animals developing this adaptation. Although the adaptation of the saber-like canines made these creatures successful, it seems that the shift to obligate carnivorism, along with co-evolution with large prey animals, led the saber-toothed cats of each time period to extinction. As per Van Valkenburgh, the adaptations that made saber-toothed cats successful also made the creatures vulnerable to extinction. In her example, trends toward an increase in size, along with greater specialization, acted as a "macro-evolutionary ratchet": when large prey became scarce or extinct, these creatures would be unable to adapt to smaller prey or consume other sources of food, and would be unable to reduce their size so as to need less food.

More recently, it has been suggested that Thylacosmilus differed radically from its placental counterparts in possessing differently shaped canines and lacking incisors. This suggests that it was not ecologically analogous to other saber-teeth and possibly an entrail specialist. Another study has found that other saber toothed species similarly had diverse lifestyles and that superficial anatomical similarities obscure them.

Phylogeny of feliform saber-tooths
The following cladogram shows the relationships between the feliform saber-tooths, including the Nimravidae, Barbourofelidae and Machairodontinae.Piras P, Maiorino L, Teresi L, Meloro C, Lucci F, Kotsakis T, Raia P (2013) Data from: Bite of the cats: relationships between functional integration and mechanical performance as revealed by mandible geometry. Dryad Digital Repository. https://dx.doi.org/10.5061/dryad.kp8t3 Saber-toothed groups are marked with background colors.

Saber-tooth genera

Saber-tooth taxonomy
All saber-toothed mammals lived between 33.7 million and 9,000 years ago, but the evolutionary lines that led to the various saber-tooth genera started to diverge much earlier. It is thus a polyphyletic grouping.

The lineage that led to Thylacosmilus was the first to split off, in the late Cretaceous. It is a metatherian, and thus more closely related to kangaroos and opossums than the felines. The hyaenodonts diverged next, possibly before Laurasiatheria, then the oxyaenids, and then the nimravids, before the diversification of the truly feline saber-tooths.
 Class: Mammalia
 Clade: Metatheria (diverged ?, in the Cretaceous)
 Order: †Deltatheroida (an extinct group of metatherian carnivores)
 Family: †Deltatheridiidae
 †Lotheridium
 Order: †Sparassodonta (an extinct group of metatherian carnivores)
 Family: †Thylacosmilidae
 †Patagosmilus
 †Anachlysictis
 †Thylacosmilus
 Subclass: Placentalia
 Order: †Hyaenodonta
 †Boualitomus
 Family: †Sinopidae
 Genus: †Sinopa
 Superfamily: †Hyaenodontoidea
 Family: †Hyaenodontidae
 Subfamily: †Hyaenodontinae
 Tribe: †Hyaenodontini
 Genus: †Hyaenodon
 Family: †Proviverridae
 †Parvagula
 Superfamily: †Hyainailouroidea
 Family: †Hyainailouridae (paraphyletic family)
 Subfamily: †Hyainailourinae (paraphyletic subfamily)
 Tribe: †Leakitheriini
 Genus: †Leakitherium
 Tribe: †Metapterodontini
 Genus: †Metapterodon
 Order: †Oxyaenodonta
 Family: †Oxyaenidae
 Subfamily: †Machaeroidinae
 Genus: †Apataelurus
 Genus: †Machaeroides
 Order Carnivora
 Family †Nimravidae (diverged from the feliforms 48–55 Ma BP, in the late Eocene)
 Subfamily †Nimravinae (Dinictis)
 Subfamily †Hoplophoninae
 Suborder Feliformia ('cat-like' carnivores)
 Family †Barbourofelidae (sister taxa to Felidae)
 Family Felidae (true cats)
 Subfamily †Machairodontinae (diverged ?, in the ?)
 Tribe †Homotherini
 †Homotherium
 †Machairodus
 †Xenosmilus
 Tribe †Metailurini
 †Dinofelis
 †Metailurus
 Tribe †Smilodontini
 †Megantereon
 †Paramachairodus
 †Smilodon

References

Further reading
 Mol, D., W. v. Logchem, K. v. Hooijdonk, R. Bakker. The Saber-Toothed Cat. DrukWare, Norg 2008. .
 Sardella, R. "Web of Knowledge [v5.6]". SOC PALEONTOLOGICA ITALIANA, C/O E. SERPAGLI, EDITOR, IST DI PALEONTOLOGIA VIA UNIV 4, MODENA, 00000, ITALY, 10 Mar. 2012. Web. 18 Oct. 2012. <http://apps.webofknowledge.com/full_record.do?product=WOS>.

External links
 Saber-toothed Cats at the Illinois State Museum
 Saber-toothed Cats at the UC Berkeley Museum of Paleontology
 Prehistoric cats and prehistoric cat-like creatures

Apex predators
Saber-toothed cats